Sol is a fictional character written for and performed on stage by the Canadian actor Marc Favreau. 

Sol is a clown (tramp type) who handily deconstructs the French language, to the amusement of adults as well as children. Sol mostly appears alone on stage and recites comic monologues dealing with current social and political issues. 

Sol began as a regular on La Boîte à surprise, a long-running children's television show on the French language Radio-Canada network. At that time, the act was called Bim et Sol. The character proved popular so Marc Favreau developed Sol's monologues into a one-man show. Favreau then teamed up with another clown for Sol et Bouton. He also appeared on a popular television series called Sol et Gobelet opposite Luc Durand. Sol also appeared on a television series on TVOntario called Parlez-moi, which taught basic French, as it is spoken in Quebec and other parts of Canada.

See also
Marc Favreau
List of Quebec television series
Television of Quebec
Culture of Quebec

Culture of Quebec
Fictional clowns
Comedians from Quebec